Siddheshwar Temple is a temple in Solapur district, Maharashtra, India. It is sacred to Hindus and members of the Lingayat faith. There is a lake within the temple complex.

Temple
The temple is dedicated to its namesake Siddheshwar, a twelfth-century devotee of Shiva who is considered a god in the Lingayat faith and the grāmadevatā of Solapur. It is at the temple's site where he is recorded as having attained samadhi, and as such the location is revered by devotees. Upon achieving samadhi in 1167AD, Siddeshwar attained samadhi and A marble samadhi exists at the centre of the temple today.

Siddheshwar is attributed to having installed 68 Shiva lingams in the main courtyard; the amrit (immortality) linga being one of them. There are several smaller temples within the complex, such as ones dedicated to Ganesha, Vithoba and Rukmini. Additionally, within the sanctum of the main temple complex there is an idolic effigy of Siddheshwar. A silver-plated figure of the mythological bull nandi is also present.

History 
As per the records, Siddheshwar Temple was built by Shri Siddharameshwar, a yogi and devotee of Shri Mallikarjuna of Srisailam. He built this temple and made 68 Shiva lingams in the temple as per the instructions of his guru. It is said that the city of Solapur began to prosper at the birth of Shri Siddheshwar, who is also considered as the sixth  god of the Lingayat faith, and devotees seek the blessings of this deity.

The temple and lake have been administered since 1899 by the ‘Shri Siddheshwar Devsthan Panch Committee’.

The best time to visit the temple is the  Makar Sankranti festival in mid-January,when a grand celebration takes place for three days. Gadda Yatra, a local fair, is arranged for fifteen days in the vicinity of the temple. The temple is in honour of Siddheshwar, a devotee of Shiva.

Ritual

On Makarsankrat, there are annual pilgrimages called 'Gadda'. This is when the Gadda Yatra celebration begins and continues for 15 days. A procession called the 'Procession of Kathis' is conducted at the temple.

The temple is attended by members of Veerashaiva.

References 

Hindu temples in Maharashtra
Shiva temples in Maharashtra